The Leibniz Institute DSMZ - German Collection of Microorganisms and Cell Cultures GmbH (German: Leibniz-Institut DSMZ-Deutsche Sammlung von Mikroorganismen und Zellkulturen GmbH), located in Braunschweig, is a research infrastructure in the Leibniz Association. Also the DSMZ is the world's most diverse collection  of bioresources (status 2021: 75,000 bioresources). These include microorganisms (including more than 32,000 bacterial strains, 690 archaeal strains, 7,000 strains of yeasts and fungi) as well as more than 840 human and animal cell cultures, over 1. 500 plant viruses, over 940 bacteriophages, and 250 plasmids (status 2021). Since 2010, the scientific director of the Leibniz Institute DSMZ has been Jörg Overmann, a microbiologist with a PhD. He holds a professorship in microbiology at the Technical University of Braunschweig. Since August 2018, he has led the institute in a dual leadership with Bettina Fischer as administrative director.

History

Structure
Nearly 200 scientists and technical staff currently work at the DSMZ. It is a company/non-profit organization recognized as a public benefit. In 2018, the Leibniz Institute DSMZ was recognized as the world's first registered collection under Directive (European Union) 511/2014, providing all users with the necessary legal certainty in the handling of their bioresources in accordance with the so-called Nagoya Protocol.
The DSMZ is a partner in international organizations such as the European Culture Collections' Organisation (ECCO), the World Federation for Culture Collections (WFCC) and the Global Biodiversity Information Facility (GBIF).

Functions
DSMZ is a global service provider with more than 10,000 customers in over 80 countries and provides microorganisms and cell cultures for university, non-university and industrial research in the life sciences. It also serves as a patent and security depository for biological material (a total of over 11,700 bioresources) in accordance with the guidelines of the Budapest Treaty. It is the only patent depository for bioresources in Germany. The DSMZ only holds bioresources in biosafety level 1 and 2.

In 2012, the freely accessible database BacDive (The Bacterial Diversity Metadatabase) was established, which is maintained and curated by the DSMZ. The database contains information on a wide variety of strains of prokaryotes; in 2016, information on 53,978 strains could be found there, and by 2021, the number had increased to more than 82,000.

Departments
In addition to the research departments Microbial Ecology and Diversity Research  and Microbial Genome Research, the eight departments of the DSMZ include the collection departments Microorganisms, Bioresources for Bioeconomy and Health Research, Human and Animal Cell Lines and Plant Viruses  as well as the departments Services  and Bioinformatics and Databases. The establishment of independent junior research groups (as of 2021: VirusInteract (interactions of plant viruses with their hosts) and Microbial Biotechnology) provides qualification opportunities for young scientists conducting research on selected, current topics.

References 

Leibniz Association
Organisations based in Braunschweig
Medical research institutes in Germany
Microbiology organizations
Culture collections
Medical and health organisations based in Lower Saxony
Organizations established in 1969